Chih-yu Shih (born 8 August 1958) is a political science professor in Taiwan and National Chair Professor of  the Republic of China.

Life
Chih-yu Shih graduated from National Taiwan University. He earned an M.P.P. at Harvard University and Ph.D. at the Josef Korbel School of International Studies (the University of Denver).

He was a visiting scholar at Stanford, Duke, Princeton, Durham, Chuo University and University of Tübingen. His present occupation is:
Life-time distinguished professor at National Taiwan University
Adjunct professor at National Sun Yat-sen University

List of works (books in English)
Post-Chineseness: Cultural Politics and International Relations (Albany: State University of New York Press, 2022).
Eros of International Relations: Self-feminizing and the Claiming of Postcolonial Chineseness (Hong Kong: Hong Kong University Press, 2022).
Colonial Legacies and Contemporary Studies of China and Chineseness: Unlearning Binaries, Strategizing Self (Co-ed.) (Singapore: World Scientific, 2020)
China Studies in the Philippines: Intellectual Paths and the Formation of a Field (Co-ed.) (London: Routledge, 2019).
China Studies in South and Southeast Asia: Between Pro-China and Objectivism (Co-ed.) (Singapore: World Scientific, 2019).
China and International Theory: The Balance of Relationships (London: Routledge, 2019).
From Sinology to Post-Chineseness: Intellectual Histories of China, Chinese People and Chinese Civilization (ed.) (Beijing: Chinese Social Science Press, 2017).
Producing China in Southeast Asia – Knowledge, Identity and Migrant Chineseness (ed.) (Singapore: Springer Nature, 2017).
Post-Communist Sinology in Transformation: Views from the Czech Republic, *Mongolia, Poland, and Russia (ed.) (Hong Kong: Chinese University Press of Hong Kong, 2016).
Understanding 21st Century China in Buddhist Asia: History, Modernity and International Relations (Co-ed.) (Bangkok: Asia Research Center, Chulalongkorn University, 2016).
Post-Western International Relations Reconsidered: The Pre-modern Politics of Gongsun Long (New York: Palgrave, 2015).
Re-producing Chineseness in Southeast Asia: Scholarship and Identity in Comparative Perspectives (ed.) (Abingdon, Oxfordshire: Routledge, 2015).*Harmonious Intervention: China’s Quest for Relational Security (Surrey: Ashgate, 2014).
Multicultural China: A Statistical Year Book (Co-ed.) (New York: Springer, 2014).
Borderland Politics in Northern India (Co-ed.) (Exon: Routledge, 2014).
Sinicizing International Relations: Self, Civilization and Intellectual Politics of Subaltern East Asia (London: Palgrave, 2013).
Tibetan Studies in Comparaitive Perspectives (co-ed.) (London: Routledge, 2012).
On India By China: From Civilization to Nation State (co-ed.) (New York: Cambria, 2012).
Civilization, Modernity, and Nation in East Asia (London: Routledge: 2012).
《はじめに──戦後日本の中国研究》（合編）（東京：平凡社，2010）.
Democracy Made in Taiwan: The “Success State” as a Political Theory (Lanham: Lexington Press, 2007).
Autonomy, Ethnicy and Poverty in Southwestern China: The State Turned Upside Down (London: Palgrave/Macmillan, 2007).
Navigating Sovereignty: World Politics Lost in China (London: Palgrave/Macmillan, 2003).
Negotiating Ethnicity in China: Citizenship as a Response to the State (New York: Routledge, 2002).
Reform, Identity, and Chinese Foreign Policy (Taipei: Vanguard Foundation, 2000).
Collective Democracy: The Political and Legal Reform in China (Hong Kong: The Chinese University of Hong Kong Press, together with Ann Arbor: University of Michigan Press, 1999).
State and Society in China’s Political Economy: The Cultural Dynamics of China's Socialist Reform (Boulder: Lynne Rienner 1995).
Symbolic War: The Chinese Use of Force, 1840-1980,  (co-author) (Taipei: Institute of International Relations, 1993).
China's Just World: The Morality of Chinese Foreign Policy (Boulder, Colo.: Lynne Rienner, 1993).
Contending Dramas: A Cognitive Approach to International Organizations (co-editor) (New York: Praeger, 1992).
The Spirit of Chinese Foreign Policy: A Psycho-cultural View (London: Macmillan 1990).

Honours and awards
Excellence Research Award, National Science Council 1995–99, 2004–07
Fulbright Scholar 1997
Ministry of Education Academic Award 2000
National Chair Professor Life time, Ministry of Education 2001–2004, 2013–
University Chair Professor 2007-2019

and many others.

See also
 Lucian Pye
 Liberalism
 Postmodernism
 Deconstruction

References

External links
石之瑜 «  國立臺灣大學政治學系
SHIH Chih-Yu : World Who's Who
Amazon.com: Chih-Yu Shih: Books

1958 births
Academic staff of the National Taiwan University
National Taiwan University alumni
Harvard Kennedy School alumni
Writers from Taipei
Living people
Fulbright alumni